Rafeek Khan (born 24 February 1966) is an Indian politician. He is a Member of the Rajasthan Legislative Assembly from the Adarsh Nagar Assembly constituency since 2018. He is associated with the Indian National Congress.

References 

1966 births
Rajasthan MLAs 2018–2023
Indian National Congress (Organisation) politicians
Living people